Anti-American sentiment in Germany is the dislike of the American government or people present in Germany. Anti-Americanism has been present in Germany throughout history with several notable incidents. Anti-Americanism was advanced by local leaders under the influence of the former Soviet Union, during the Cold War in East Germany, with dissenters being punished. In West Germany, this sentiment was generally limited to left wing politicians.

Scholars such as Noam Chomsky and Nancy Snow have argued that the application of the term "anti-American" to the population of other countries does not make any sense, as it implies that not liking the American government or its policies is socially undesirable or even comparable to a crime. In this regard, the term has been likened to the propagandistic usage of the term "anti-Sovietism" in the USSR.

History
During 1820-40 era, hostility toward America stemmed from its perceived cultural inferiority.  Between 1820 and 1870, more than seven and a half million German immigrants came to the United States, buying farms or taking industrial jobs.  Few returned to their homeland.

World Wars
Germany and the United States were at war 1917-1918 and 1941-1945.

Postwar
In the postwar era from 1945-1970, Americanisation was part of the process of becoming a Western European, and anti-American sentiment was weak. However in the late 1960s, West Germany's youth contrasted the images of Woodstock—which they liked—and the Vietnam War—which they hated. Young rebels turned to violence to destroy the foundations of a society that backed American cultural imperialism. Anti-Americanism reappeared among some intellectuals after the attacks on 11 September 2001 because of the perceived links between globalisation, Americanisation, and terrorism.

After World War II, Germany was split into two parts, East Germany and West Germany. In socialist East Germany, anti-Americanism was official government policy. Anti-Americanism was strong among left wingers. Some right wingers saw the United States as a protector against communism, while others saw the American way of life as uncultured.

Iraq War of 2003
The War in Iraq in 2003 was highly unpopular at all levels of German society. Chancellor Gerhard Schröder stated that Germany would refuse to provide troops or money for the Invasion of Iraq.

Donald Trump

With the election of Donald Trump, there have been renewed fears among American think-tanks about the rise of Anti-American sentiment in Germany. Donald Trump, the grandson of a German immigrant, has been noted for his euroscepticism, while Germany is one of the most Pro-EU countries in the world. In 2017, German magazine Stern published a cover depicting Donald Trump performing the Nazi salute, with the inscription Sein Kampf, obviously referencing Mein Kampf. Germans have generally been more negative about their relations with the United States than most other European countries. Trump was routinely criticised by German politicians, like Chancellor Angela Merkel.

See also
Germany–United States relations
Anti-American Sentiment
Cold War

References

Further reading
 Berendse, Gerrit-Jan. "German anti-Americanism in context." Journal of European Studies 33.3-4 (2003): 333-350.
 Berman, Russell A. Anti-Americanism in Europe: A cultural problem (Hoover Press, 2004).
 Diner, Dan. America in the Eyes of the Germans: An Essay on Anti-Americanism (1996) on critics who saw the USA in terms of greedy hypocrites who hated all higher culture. excerpt
 Forsberg, Tuomas. "German foreign policy and the war on Iraq: Anti-Americanism, pacifism or emancipation?." Security Dialogue 36.2 (2005): 213-231.
 Klautke, Egbert. "Anti-Americanism in twentieth-century Europe." Historical Journal 54.4 (2011): 1125-1139. online
 Muller, Christoph Hendrik. West Germans Against the West: Anti-Americanism in Media and Public Opinion in the Federal Republic of Germany, 1949-68 (Palgrave 2010) excerpt
 O’Connor, Brendon and Martin Griffiths, eds. The Rise of Anti-Americanism (2005)
 Rubin, Barry M., and Judith Colp Rubin. Hating America: a history (Oxford University Press, 2004).

 
Germany
Germany–United States relations